VePlus is the updated name of the subscription channel of Cisneros Media. Previously known in some areas as Venevision Continental, Novelisima VePlus TV, V Mas TV  (subsidiary of Grupo Cisneros), VePlus has retained much of the programming of Venevision Continental, Novelisima, and produces its own content in Venezuela and Miami.

History

Born with the name Venevision Continental, a cable television station seen in National and International Venezuela, Latin America and Europe as the international signal of Venevision. It was inaugurated on August 28, 2000 and ended its broadcasts in July 2008. It was a channel offering entertainment programs, news, talk shows, and soap operas, seeking to satisfy the needs of Spanish-speaking homes. Broadcast on DirecTV channel 774 to September 2006. The channel belongs to Venezuela's Venevision Canal on the channel who show their productions abroad.

In December 2007, the Cisneros Group decided to launch the pilot project called Venevision in Venezuela Novelísima Plus and, seeing the development and the large audience reached by this, in June 2008 Venevision Continental Novelísima relaunched with the name. It specialized in soap operas, telenovelas, Latin entertainment, talk shows and contests, eliminating opinion, politics, news media, etc.

From Wednesday July 18, 2012 "Novelísima" and "Venevision Plus Dominicana" merged its signal to transform "Ve Plus TV"In 2017 was branded VePlus.

Feeds 

 Feed 1 Ve Plus: Latin America and Spain, except  
 Feed 2 VePlus: 
 Feed 3 VePlus:

Programming 

Its programming is based on soap operas, talk shows and variety shows, as an entertainment channel aimed at Hispanics and Latinos in the United States and in other countries.

Venevision Continental

Venevision Continental is the Enterprise Unit that manages Pay-TV channels and services for Cisneros

External links

www.veplusgo.com
www.cisneros.com
www.novelisima.com

Television stations in Venezuela
Television networks in Venezuela
Mass media in Venezuela
Spanish-language television stations
Television channels and stations established in 2000
Venevisión
2000 establishments in Venezuela